Ranno is a village in Jaunpur district in the Indian state of Uttar Pradesh. Ranno is located in the Purwanchal region, between Jaunpur and Badlapur.

It has seven sub villages including Dakhin Patti, Uttar patti, Barre Patti, Sadaruddin pur, Pura Sherkhan, Mohammad Pur and mahiman pur, with a combined population of nearly 8000. There are significant Muslim and Hindu populations in the region, with Muslims being the majority, but there is no conflict between these groups. Ranno has a good literacy rate, but overall state of education needs improvement. There are many engineers, doctors and government employees and chartered accountant(CA).

Ranno Amari

Ranno Amari is a major event conducted by the residents, which attracts a big crowd from all around India. It is an event carried out to mourn for the 72 martyrs of Karbala, Iraq. It is one of the largest peaceful gatherings in India. A 118-foot tall flag (Alam) is hoisted every year for this event.

Schools
Urdu Prathamic Vidyalaya 
Seth Ali Ahmad Orientel College
K F public school
M S D convent

Historic places and sights 
Sadar Imam Bargah Ranno
Roza-E-Rasul-E-Khuda
Roza Bibi Fatima Zahra
Roza Imam Hussain
Roza Maula Abbas
Makhdum Shah Baba Mazar

Villages in Jaunpur district